Johanna "Jo" Doll is a Democratic member of the Missouri House of Representatives, first election from the state's 83rd House district in 2020, and after redistricting in 2022, reelected from the 91st district.

Career
Jo Doll received a BA in Psychology and from Washington University in St. Louis and a Master's in Physical Therapy from Washington University School of Medicine. She  worked as a physical therapist before running for office. She became involved with politics in 2016, and was elected vice chair of the Webster Groves Board of Education the same year.

Electoral History 
 Rep. Doll has not yet had any opponents in the Democratic primaries, thus winning the party nomination each time by default.

Personal life
Doll is a Presbyterian.

References

Living people
21st-century American politicians
21st-century American women politicians
Women state legislators in Missouri
Democratic Party members of the Missouri House of Representatives
Year of birth missing (living people)
Washington University School of Medicine alumni
Washington University in St. Louis alumni